Watercress is a children's book written by Andrea Wang, illustrated by Jason Chin, and published on March 30, 2021 by Neal Porter Books.

In 2022, the book won the Asian/Pacific American Award for Literature for Picture Book, Caldecott Medal, and Newbery Honor.

Synopsis 
A young girl is in the car with her brother and parents when they come across wild watercress growing on the side of the road. Her parents excitedly pull over and instruct the children to help them gather the watercress. The girl feels embarrassed to be seen by passing cars and disgusted by the mud and snails that are on the plants. The watercress is prepared for dinner that night, but the girl initially refuses to eat it because she is ashamed of their "dinner from a ditch". Her mother brings out a picture from her childhood and, for the first time, talks about the famine that her family suffered. Feeling guilty, the girl takes a bite of the watercress. She discovers that she likes the taste and reflects on the new memory she and her family have created.

Reception 
Watercress is a Junior Library Guild book. It was met with critical acclaim, including starred reviews from Kirkus Reviews, Publishers Weekly, School Library Journal, and Shelf Awareness.

Kirkus Reviews called the book "[u]nderstated, deep, and heart-rending." Writing for School Library Journal, Elissa Cooper called Watercress "[a] powerful story sure to awaken empathy and curiosity." Publishers Weekly said it was "[a]n adept gem of a picture book, encompassing both universal intergenerational embarrassment and a specific diasporic shift in cultural perception."

Watercress was named one of the best children's books of 2021 by BookPage, The Boston Globe, Chicago Public Library, The Horn Book, Kirkus Reviews, The New York Public Library, The New York Times, Publishers Weekly, School Library Journal, Shelf Awareness, The Wall Street Journal, and The Washington Post. Center for the Study of Multicultural Children's Literature also included it in their list of the year's best multicultural children's books. In 2022, Weston Woods Studios released an animated film based on the book, narrated by Sunny Lu.

References 

2021 children's books
American picture books
Caldecott Medal–winning works
Newbery Honor-winning works